Fadzuhasny Juraimi (born 3 September 1979) is a retired Singaporean footballer for S-League and also the Singapore national football team. He is currently coaching Singapore U19.

He is a natural striker who is known for his volleys and clinical finishing.

Club career

International career
He made his debut for the Singapore in 2001.

External links
data2.7m.cn

Singaporean footballers
Singapore international footballers
1979 births
Living people
Home United FC players
Warriors FC players
Tanjong Pagar United FC players
Young Lions FC players
Geylang International FC players
Woodlands Wellington FC players
Singapore Premier League players
Association football forwards